Subliminal Genocide is a 2006 album by the American one-man black metal act Xasthur. It was reviewed as being "more spiteful than...previous albums".

Track listing

Personnel
 Malefic – vocals, all instruments, production

References

2006 albums
Xasthur albums